Meander Creek Reservoir is a lake located along Meander Creek in Mahoning County and Trumbull County near Austintown, Ohio. The Meander Creek Reservoir is owned by the Mahoning Valley Sanitary District MVSD and is the largest provider of clean and safe drinking water of Mahoning and Trumbull County Ohio.

In 1920, a petitioning effort began in the Mahoning Valley, an area consisting of cities such as Youngstown and Niles, Ohio for the formation of Water district. It was hoped that all the Mahoning Valley communities would unite, but there were too many obstacles. It settled on Youngstown and Niles as the two members of the future Water District in 1925.

The district bought its first piece of land in 1927 from Josiah Kirkpatrick, who changed his name to Kirk. Kirk Road in Austintown, Ohio was named after him.

Although, many water sources had been considered, including Lake Erie, it was decided to build a Mineral Ridge (Weathersfield Township),Ohio Dam on Meander Creek to create the reservoir with a purification plant. The total cost was nearly $9.2 million.

Construction was started in 1929 and continued through 1932 when the MVSD opened for business. In 1944, McDonald village was added as the third member.

The Auditor of State of Ohio has issued their Profile of the District in a recent Audit report, 2017.

The Mahoning Valley Sanitary District (“the District”) was formed in 1926 and began supplying water in 1932. The District provides quality water to the member cities – the City of Youngstown and the City of Niles; and by special contract to the Village of McDonald. The members serve surrounding areas such as Girard, Canfield, Mineral Ridge, Lordstown and portions of 10 other townships.

The District is a political subdivision of the State of Ohio established under the authority of the Sanitary Act of Ohio and governed by the Ohio Revised Code Chapter 6115.

A Court of Jurisdiction that includes the Trumbull and Mahoning County Court of Common Pleas and a Board of Directors that is appointed by the member cities oversees the District.

The District's Board of Directors consists of four members, two from the City of Youngstown and two from the City of Niles. The Sanitary District Act empowers the District to provide water supply, treatment, transmission feeder systems and storage reservoirs, but not distribution.

The District utilizes a five-year forecast as the original document from which to form succeeding year's operating and debt budget. After updating the forecast for changes in revenue and expense assumptions, department heads will operate from the established budget which is prepared and approved by the Board of Directors prior to July 1 of each fiscal year. The line item budgets are reviewed periodically to ensure management becomes aware of any significant changes during the fiscal year.

Local Economy:

The District's water supply comes from the Meander Creek Reservoir. The Reservoir is seven miles long, covers 2,010 acres with 40 miles of shoreline, and has a capacity of 11 billion gallons. District owned land includes 5,500 acres enclosed by 35 miles of fence. The land is reforested with 4 million evergreens and serves as an unofficial fish and game refuge with no public access permitted.

The District's current capacity is 60 million gallons per day and for recent years the average pumping per day over a fiscal year has been 21.5 million gallons per day. The District's water supply is treated using state of the art settling technology and equipment to deliver, pure, safe, clear, sparkling, soft, potable water to its member cities Youngstown, Niles and the Village of McDonald. These member cities will distribute treated water to many surrounding towns, cities, and villages in the Mahoning Valley which total approximately 225,000 end users.

The Board's overall hiring policy is to maintain the proper staffing levels to ensure continued operations for the delivery of services to the District's member municipalities and onto the communities they serve. In the prior fiscal year, the Board rehired a former professional engineer to temporarily reassume the position of the District's Chief Engineer.

In January 2017, the Chief Engineer tendered his resignation. This left the Board in a difficult situation as this position also held an Ohio EPA Class IV water supply license which is an essential requirement for this facility.

The Board utilized existing provisions in the law to bring on board the firm MS Consultants, Inc., to fill the position of Chief Engineer until such time that the Board could find an individual to fill this position. The Board began its search for a qualified individual utilizing a firm that specializes in finding people who hold the credentials required for the position of Chief Engineer.

At the present time the Board is interviewing prospective candidates for this important position. Additionally in this fiscal year the position of Plant Operations Manager was abolished as the need for this position was determined by the Board as non-essential.

The District's hourly employees are represented by AFSCME Local 1649. The Union and the Board of Directors came to agreement on the CBA in August 2016 and this agreement will be in place through June 30, 2019.

The District has implemented a plant wide Supervisory Control and Data Acquisition (SCADA) system. The SCADA system will automate some functions of the water purification process that are currently performed manually by District employees. After fiscal year end 2016, the District's management put additional effort into completing that part of SCADA that was envisioned to have remote control of certain pumping processes.

The Board had made the decision to abolish certain job positions that have been directly affected by the implementation of the SCADA system and did so in January 2017. The Board then created four new positions called Utility/Operators that do a similar job that was required previously but will have additional job duties and requirements that the abolished positions were not required to do.

Discussions were held with Union officials and those employees directly affected by the positions that were abolished. These employees were then offered those positions or another position to remain employed at the District. All the affected employees chose the positions offered by the Board. These new positions are working well in the operation of our plant.

The Board annually advertises for bids on chemicals that are needed in the purification process. The District will continue to have concerns with costs for the purification process as the high cost for energy drives the overall cost for chemicals. The unpredictability of prices for chemicals as well as our other variable costs such as electricity, natural gas heat and sludge removal will continue to remain an area of concern for District management. As is the case in most years some chemical costs come in higher than the year before with some coming in a little lower.

Overall though, the cost of chemicals to treat water has increased in the fiscal year 2017 but was affected by the addition of certain chemicals to address raw water conditions not usually seen at our facility as well as adding a chemical that improves safety in the distribution system of the District to its member cities, which also adds benefit to each City's own distribution system.

As mentioned in previous reports, oil and gas exploration (fracking) in our area may have contributed to our ability to enter into variable contracts to provide gas and electricity. The last several fiscal years have provided us with substantial savings to budget on these variable expenses. It remains to be seen whether or not this market will affect this part of our operation in the future.

The MVSD is now, though, enjoying the positive aspects of market forces in this industry. Budgeting for energy costs will continue to present management with a more complex set of factors to determine energy costs for producing potable water.

The constantly changing conditions of the Meander Reservoir have always contributed to some uncertainty regarding the needs of treatment. The types and volume of chemicals needed to produce potable water each and every year requires much analysis and a good bit of luck, and as mentioned previously in this report the District had to implement changes to its treatment process as was necessary because of raw water conditions.

The Ohio Revised Code section 6115.01 through 6115.79 provides the orderly mechanism for the District to establish and receive the revenue stream that will provide for daily operating needs and maintaining the facility's buildings and process equipment through capital improvements.

The Board and management review and update the five-year operating and capital improvement forecast to determine the revenue stream necessary to maintain operations and capital improvement projects deemed essential to maintain our plant going forward in the near future and beyond.

The implementation and ongoing use and modification of our five year financial model has been the essential tool to provide non-biased legitimate and useful information to all stakeholders and receive a most important positive feedback and acceptance from those decision makers.

The Mahoning Valley population in the service area which the District has provided potable water for 85 years has become significantly smaller. The belief of all stakeholders that the District water plant be maintained at a level of excellence in all areas of production and management will provide serious and meaningful deliberations in all years going forward.

The reservoir's south end continues as a little river going southward. The reservoir is managed by the Mahoning Valley Sanitary District. Hunting, boating and fishing are prohibited. Most of the reservoir is located in Austintown Township in Mahoning County or in Weathersfield Township in Trumbull County.

Reference:
The dam creating the reservoir, Mineral Ridge Dam, is an earthen dam built in 1932.  It is 60 feet high, 3480 feet long at its crest, impounds a maximum capacity of 62,000 acre-feet, and is owned and operated by the Mahoning Valley Sanitary District.

References

External links
 The Mahoning Valley Sanitary District

Bodies of water of Mahoning County, Ohio
Bodies of water of Trumbull County, Ohio
Reservoirs in Ohio
Dams in Ohio
United States local public utility dams
Earth-filled dams